Brenthia hibiscusae is a moth of the family Choreutidae. It is known from Cuba, Puerto Rico and Venezuela.

The length of the forewings is about 3.6 mm for males and 3.8-4.1 for females. It has a prominent white spot in the black terminal field of the forewing.

The larvae feed on Hibiscus sabdariffa.

References

Brenthia